The Han Triumph, also known as Wind Ode, is a Chinese television series based on historical events in the early Han dynasty, beginning with the founding of the dynasty by Liu Bang (Emperor Gao) after his triumph over Xiang Yu, and the events leading to the reign of Liu Heng (Emperor Wen). Directed by Huang Jianzhong, the series starred Ray Lui, Wang Ji, Liu Mu, Zhang Guangbei, Chen Wei and Li Qingxiang in the leading roles. It was first broadcast on CCTV-8 in China on 17 December 2011.

Cast

 Ray Lui as Emperor Gaozu of Han
 Wang Ji as Empress Lü Zhi
 Liu Mu as Emperor Wen of Han
 Su Yanzheng as teenage Emperor Wen
 Wang Liang as child Emperor Wen
 Zhang Guangbei as Han Xin
 Luo Yinan as Empress Dou
 Zhang Han as Zhang Shizhi
 Chen Wei as Empress Dowager Bo
 Lei Zhenyu as Bo Zhao
 Wang Tao as Jia Yi
 Li Qingxiang as Zhou Bo
 Wang Hui as Chen Ping
 Mao Junjie as Princess Yuan of Lu
 Zhang Di as Emperor Hui of Han
 Xia Lu as Empress Zhang Yan
 Zhang Chuqian as young Empress Zhang
 Zhang Tong as Shen Yiji
 Zhang Yuqi as Chunyu Tiying
 Liu Yuxin as Concubine Qi
 Zhou Shuai as Liu Zhang
 Ai Lisen as Lady Tao
 Zhu Decheng as Fan Kuai
 Lan Lan as Lü Xu
 Zhu Xiaochun as Guan Ying
 Lin Daxin as Xiao He
 Li Yonggui as Lu Gu
 Zhang Jinhe as Li Xi
 Yang Fengyu as Liu Mao
 Zhao Dongbo as Song Chang
 Jia Wei as Zhang Wu
 Guo Shengran as young Zhang Wu
 Tu Men as Modu Chanyu
 Wang Yining as Xiangrui
 Dai Xiaoxu as Kai Zhang
 Gang Yi as Deng Tong
 Cai Hongxiang as Chunyu Yi
 Wei Zheng as Liu Ruyi
 Tan Qiaochu as young Liu Ruyi
 Fan Ying as Liu Qi
 Xiaopidan as young Liu Qi
 Li Xiaofeng as Chao Cuo
 Miao Qiang as Zhou Yafu
 Fu Hongjun as Xiahou Ying
 Zhang Ke as Lü Chan
 Zhang Qizhi as Zhang Cang
 Yi Liqi as Lü Lu
 Liu Yan as Lü Qiang
 Zhou Zhonghe as Commandant Wang
 Kong Qingsan as You Da
 Hao Aimin as Liu Taigong
 Qian Meitong as Yu'er
 Ding Ning as Minnü
 Xu Min as Cao Shen
 Zhou Yulai as Shen Tujia
 Zang Jinsheng as Zhao Tuo
 Hu Zhentao as Liu Pi
 Zhu Jiasan as Liu Chang
 Guo Yanze as young Liu Chang
 Li Qiang as Liu Ze
 Ding Ze'en as Liu Gong
 Jiang Xue as Bo Chan
 Jia Tong as Liu Hong
 Zhang Yi as Liu Xi
 Wang Hongsheng as Lü Shizhi
 Jiao Changdao as Yuan Gu
 Qian Bo as Chen Xian
 Fang Feilin as Hong Jiru
 Ruan Deqiang as Fan Kang
 Batu as Laoshang Chanyu
 Enchao as Right Virtuous Prince
 Sengge Renqin as Left Virtuous Prince
 Tongtemu'er as King of Loufan
 Qi Chaolumen as King of Hunxie
 Qi Chaoluhui as King of Xiutu
 Wu Ge as King of Baiyang
 Yang Miao as Rui'er
 Huang Yucheng as young Rui'er
 Xiahou Bin as Zhongxingshuo
 Ji Li as Lü Ying
 Pan Li as Yinmei
 Dong Fufei as Yuehe
 Li Bing as Xiangnü
 Ma Xiaowei as Zhang Liang
 Huang Suying as Piaomu
 Song Yan as Marquis of Dongling
 Wang Shijun as Marquis of Guageng
 Li Baocheng as Ying Bu
 Zhong Ling as Li Guang
 Wang Moxi as Lady Yan
 Mu Xintong as Zhang Wu's wife
 Chai Zhixue as Wu Huang
 Wu Xu as Tian Li
 Xia Qing as Tian Li's wife
 Chu Jian as Chen San
 Luan Zuxun as Xiao Er
 Wang Guogang as Peng Yue
 Ma Yuliang as Mengzhong Official
 Liu Honglin as Governor Li
 Xing Hao as Pass official
 Zhao Guixiang as Min Zhongju
 Wang Chunyuan as Liu Changjiu
 Wei Fei as Shopkeeper Kang
 Yang Lei as Servant boy
 Wang Ningte as Wei Wei
 Da Li as Zhongli Mo

External links
 The Han Triumph on Sina.com

2010 Chinese television series debuts
Mandarin-language television shows
Chinese historical television series
Television series set in the Western Han dynasty